Lukino is a rural locality (a village) in Shapshinskoye Rural Settlement, Kharovsky District, Vologda Oblast, Russia. The population was 16 as of 2002.

Geography 
Lukino is located 27 km northwest of Kharovsk (the district's administrative centre) by road. Shapsha is the nearest rural locality.

References 

Rural localities in Kharovsky District